Edikang ikong is a vegetable soup that originated among the Efik people of Cross River State and Akwa Ibom State in Southeastern Nigeria. It is considered to be a delicacy among some Nigerians, and is sometimes served during occasions of importance. Edikang ikong is a nutritious soup and expensive to prepare, and has been described as being mostly eaten by rich people in Nigeria. Ingredients used in edikang ikong include beef and dried fish, bush meat, crayfish, shaki (cow tripe), kanda, pumpkin leaves, water leaves, ugu, onion, periwinkle, palm oil, salt and pepper.

After preparation, edikang ikong is typically served with fufu, wheat flour, eba, or pounded yam.

See also

 List of soups
 List of vegetable soups
 Nigerian cuisine

References

Further reading
 "The Myth of Edikang Ikong". Thisweek. Issues 157–171. 1990. page 93. 

African soups
Nigerian cuisine
Vegetable soups